Mark John Russell (born 18 December 1970) is an English former first-class cricketer.

Russell was born at Lincoln in December 1970. He later studied at Pembroke College at the University of Oxford. While studying at Oxford, Russell played first-class cricket for Oxford University in 1990 and 1991, making seven appearances. Russell scored 457 runs in his seven matches at an average of 65.29, with a high score of 84. He took four wickets in his first-class career, all coming in a single innings against Kent in 1991, which was also his final first-class match.

References

External links

1970 births
Living people
People from Lincoln, England
Alumni of Pembroke College, Oxford
English cricketers
Oxford University cricketers